Stenobrachius is a genus of lanternfishes.

Species
There are currently two recognized species in this genus:
 Stenobrachius leucopsarus (C. H. Eigenmann & R. S. Eigenmann, 1890) (Northern lampfish)
 Stenobrachius nannochir (C. H. Gilbert, 1890) (Garnet lanternfish)

References

Myctophidae
Marine fish genera
Taxa named by Carl H. Eigenmann
Taxa named by Rosa Smith Eigenmann